Colours is the eighth studio album by Eloy, released in 1980.

Track listing 
All songs written by Jim McGillivray and Eloy except as noted.
Side One
 "Horizons" – 3:20
 "Illuminations" – 6:19
 "Giant" (Sonja Brown) – 6:05
 "Impressions" (Brown) – 3:06
Side Two
"Child Migration" – 7:23
 "Gallery" – 3:08
 "Silhouette" – 6:57
 "Sunset" – 3:15

Bonus tracks on 2005 remaster

"Wings of Vision" – 4:14
"Silhouette (single edit)" – 3:30

Personnel
 Frank Bornemann — electric and acoustic guitars, lead vocals (all but 1)
 Hannes Arkona — electric and acoustic guitars
 Hannes Folberth — keyboards
 Klaus-Peter Matziol — bass, backing vocals
 Jim McGillivray — drums, percussion
 Edna and Sabine — lead vocals (1)

References

External links

1980 albums
Eloy (band) albums
Obscenity controversies in music